Milne is a large lunar crater that is located in the southern hemisphere on the far side of the Moon, named after the British mathematician and astrophysicist Edward Arthur Milne. It lies to the northeast of the Mare Australe, and southeast of Lacus Solitudinis.

The formation has been heavily eroded and reshaped by a long history of impacts, leaving a low, irregular ridge line around most of the perimeter. The southern portion of the wall has been obliterated by impacts, and this area is now overlain by the craters Milne M and Milne N.  Milne N has a ray system and is mapped as part of the Copernican System.

Although the interior floor is relatively flat, it has been marred by many impacts in the surface. The most prominent of these is the satellite crater Milne K, which is located just to the south of the midpoint. Overlapping the southern rim of K is the smaller Milne L. In the northeast part of the floor is an unusual tight formation of 10–12 small impacts that almost resembles a cluster of grapes.

The crater floor is somewhat irregular in the northwestern part, where the prominent crater Scaliger intrudes into the outer rim, leaving ejecta across the floor. Other nearby craters include Alden to the north, Parkhurst to the west, Schaeberle to the northeast, and Bjerknes to the south. Farther to the northeast is the walled plain Fermi and the impressive Tsiolkovskiy.

Satellite craters
By convention these features are identified on lunar maps by placing the letter on the side of the crater midpoint that is closest to Milne.

References

 
 
 
 
 
 
 
 
 
 
 
 

Impact craters on the Moon